Zanclognatha martha, the pine barrens zanclognatha or Martha's zanclognatha, is a litter moth of the family Erebidae. It was described by William Barnes in 1928. It is found from Ohio to Maine, south in the mountains to North Carolina and along the Coastal Plain to Texas. It is listed as threatened in the US state of Connecticut.

There is one generation in Connecticut and Missouri and two generations in the south.

Larval hosts
The larvae feed on decomposing Quercus ilicifolia leaves.

References

External links

martha
Moths described in 1928
Moths of North America